The Ministry of Religious Affairs (abbreviated as MoRA) is a government agency of Pakistan responsible for religious matters such as pilgrimage outside Pakistan, especially to India for Ziyarat, and Saudi Arabia for Umrah and Hajj. It is also responsible for the welfare and safety of pilgrims. The agency has its headquarters in Islamabad.

The Ministry was established by Prime Minister Zulfikar Ali Bhutto. Its first minister was Maulana Kausar Niazi. The current Federal Minister of Religious Affairs is Mufti Abdul Shakoor.

Wings 
The ministry is composed of several subordinate bodies including:

 Administration and Finance Wing
 Dawah and Ziarat Wing
 Development and Coordination Wing
 Directorate of Hajj
 Interfaith Harmony Wing Research and Reference Wing
 Council of Islamic Ideology
 Madrassah Education Board.

List of ministers 
The following it the list of Federal Ministers for Religious Affairs:

See also 

 Punjab Auqaf and Religious Affairs Department

References

External links

Religion
Religion in Pakistan
Pakistan